The Western Maryland Railway  was an American Class I railroad (1852–1983) which operated in Maryland, West Virginia, and Pennsylvania. It was primarily a coal hauling and freight railroad, with a small passenger train operation.
 
The WM became a property of the Chessie System holding company in 1973, although it continued independent operations until May 1975 after which time many of its lines were abandoned in favor of parallel Baltimore and Ohio Railroad (B&O) lines.  In 1983 it was fully merged into the B&O, which later was also merged with the former Chesapeake and Ohio Railroad into the Chessie System in 1987, which is now renamed as CSX Transportation.

History

Main line: Baltimore to Hagerstown 
The original main line began with the chartering of the Baltimore, Carroll and Frederick Railroad in 1852, with the intent of building a rail line from Baltimore west to Washington County, Maryland.  The Maryland General Assembly changed the name of the company to the Western Maryland Rail Road Company in 1853, and construction began from Owings Mills in 1857. An existing Northern Central Railway branch line terminating at Owings Mills was used to connect into Baltimore. The railroad was completed to Westminster in 1861 and Union Bridge in 1862. Further expansion was delayed because of the Civil War. Westward construction resumed in 1868 under Chief Engineer Joseph S. Gitt, and the line was completed to Hagerstown in 1872. This section became the East Subdivision. The company's first major car shops were established at Union Bridge.

In 1873 the WM built its own line from Owings Mills to Fulton Junction in Baltimore, and obtained trackage rights from the Baltimore and Potomac Railroad (B&P) for the remaining two miles of the route eastward to Union Station (later called Penn Station). It built a branch east of Union Station to Hillen Station, which opened in 1876 and became the company headquarters. The WM built a connection from Hagerstown to Williamsport, in order to access coal traffic from the Chesapeake and Ohio Canal.

Extensions in Maryland and Pennsylvania 
Under the leadership of company president John Mifflin Hood, the railway made its first extension into Pennsylvania by leasing a line from Edgemont, Maryland, to Waynesboro and Shippensburg.  This line became the Lurgan Subdivision and was leased from the Baltimore and Cumberland Valley Railroad in 1881, and was connected to the Harrisburg and Potomac Railroad in 1886.

A second route into Pennsylvania, the Hanover Subdivision, was acquired by the WM when it gained control of the Baltimore and Hanover Railroad, and the Gettysburg Railroad, in late 1886. This line connected to the WM main at Emory Grove, proceeded north to Hanover and Gettysburg, then southwest to connect again to the WM at Highfield, Maryland, near the Pennsylvania border. A branch from Porters to York, Pennsylvania was completed in 1893; this became the York Subdivision.

The WM established a connection with the B&O in 1892 with the opening of the Potomac Valley Rail Road (controlled by WM) between Williamsport and Big Pool, Maryland.  This connection brought a major increase in through-freight traffic. Construction of an extension from Hagerstown to Cumberland began in 1903 and completed in 1906. This became the West Subdivision.  To service the expanded system, the WM built a major shop complex at Hagerstown in 1909, with a roundhouse, machine shops and related facilities. Rail yards at Hagerstown were also expanded.

Expansion plans
The Fuller Syndicate, led by George Gould, purchased a controlling interest in the WM in 1902 and made plans for westward expansion of the system.

In 1904 the WM completed construction of a large marine terminal at Port Covington, on the Patapsco River in Baltimore, to support the Gould organization's expansion plans. The terminal facilities included coal, grain and merchandise piers, overhead cranes, 11 rail yards, warehouses, a roundhouse, a turntable and a machine shop. In the 1920s rotary dumpers for coal and coke were installed, and a large grain elevator.

In 1907 the syndicate acquired several railroad companies, including the George's Creek and Cumberland Railroad (GC&C), which had built a line west through the Cumberland Narrows, and then south to Lonaconing, Maryland. Using the portion of the line through the Narrows, the Connellsville Extension was built west from Cumberland to Connellsville, Pennsylvania, beginning in 1910, and it was completed in 1912. At Connellsville the WM connected with the Pittsburgh and Lake Erie Railroad (P&LE).  In 1915 the WM obtained trackage rights on a B&O line from Bowest Junction (2 miles south of Connellsville) to Chiefton, West Virginia, which provided access to coal mines in the area west of Fairmont, West Virginia.

The GC&C line provided the WM with access to mines in the Georges Creek Valley. In 1927 the WM abandoned some of the GC&C track and accessed additional mines in the area through trackage rights on the Cumberland and Pennsylvania Railroad (C&P). In 1944 the WM purchased the C&P, and formally merged the operations in 1953.

Although never a giant, the Connellsville subdivision of WM handled through midwest fast freight traffic and coal from company-owned mines near Fairmont and Somerset, Pennsylvania.

WM opened a passenger station in Cumberland and one in Hagerstown in 1913. The Cumberland station contained the offices for the Western Division. Today the building is called Canal Place, a facility operated by the National Park Service, and includes the station for the Western Maryland Scenic Railroad and a visitors center for the C&O Canal National Historic Park. It was added to the National Register of Historic Places in 1973. The Hagerstown station was added to the National Register of Historic Places in 1976.

West Virginia coal country 
The West Virginia Central and Pittsburg Railway (WVC&P) began as a narrow gauge line in 1880, its name and gauge changed in 1881 and in the ensuing years it opened a huge swath of timber and coal territory in the Allegheny Highlands of West Virginia.  The railroad was directly responsible for the creation of such towns as Davis, Thomas, and Parsons.

In the large valley near the mouth of Leading Creek and the Tygart Valley River, the WVC&P constructed the city of Elkins (named after investor Stephen Benton Elkins). Elkins was home to a large rail yard for the railroad and served as the hub of Western Maryland and Chessie System operations in the region well into the 1980s.

The WVC&P was sold to the Fuller Syndicate in 1902 and was merged into the Western Maryland in 1905.  Known as the Thomas Subdivision, the line connected to the Western Maryland mainline at Maryland Junction, south of Cumberland. This line, famous for its Black Water Grade in Blackwater Canyon, became an important part of the Western Maryland's success until its eventual abandonment in the 1970s.

The WVC&P established the Coal and Iron Railway (C&I) in 1899 to reach logging operations and a connection with the Chesapeake and Ohio Railway (C&O). The route left Elkins and the Tygart Valley River drainage by way of a tunnel under Cheat Mountain, followed the Shavers Fork river upstream and then the West Fork Greenbrier River down from its headwaters to Durbin in Pocahontas County, where it connected with the C&O Greenbrier Division. Construction to Durbin was complete by 1903. With the acquisition of the WVC&P in 1905, the C&I became part of WM and this line became the Durbin Subdivision.

In 1927 the WM purchased the Greenbrier, Cheat and Elk Railroad, which ran from Cheat Junction, on the Durbin sub, to Bergoo. This line became the GC&E Subdivision.  In 1929, WM's purchase of a line from the West Virginia Midland Railway extended the GC&E sub southward to Webster Springs. While these lines were originally built as logging railroads, the WM also used them for coal operations.

Twentieth century operations 
The Fuller Syndicate attempted to assemble its own transcontinental railroad system beginning around 1902, by acquiring various rail lines. It faced stiff competition from the Pennsylvania Railroad (PRR), the B&O and others, and became financially overextended in its expansion plans. As a result, the WM entered receivership in 1908. A new corporation, the Western Maryland Railway Company, was formed and purchased the WM assets in 1909, and the receivership ended in 1910.

In 1931, the Pittsburgh and West Virginia Railway (P&WV) reached Connellsville to connect with the WM. The connection enabled the formation of the Alphabet Route, a partnership involving the WM, P&WV and six other railroads that provided competition with larger railroads including the PRR. Today the P&WV is leased by the Wheeling and Lake Erie Railway.

The major rail yards on the WM were Jamison Yard at Hagerstown, capacity 3,000 cars, mainly for west-bound traffic; and Knobmount Yard, capacity 1,600 cars, south of Ridgeley, West Virginia, mainly for east-bound traffic.

The WM began using diesel locomotives in 1941 for yard operations, and for regular line use in 1949. It discontinued use of steam locomotives in 1954, despite receiving new ones as late as 1947 with its J-1 class 4-8-4s, the last new design of the wheel arrangement to be developed.

Dissolution 

Passenger service on the WM began in 1859. The WM's original Hillen Street Station in downtown Baltimore (pictured) was demolished in 1954. A smaller replacement Baltimore station was briefly used between 1954-1957.

Revenue passenger-miles declined from 26 million in 1925 to 2 million in 1956. The WM ended its passenger service on its Baltimore-Owings Mills-Thurmont-Hagerstown mainline route in 1957. Service on its Cumberland-to-Elkins line ended between 1957 and 1958. Passenger service on its final remaining line, a three day a week mixed train between Elkins and Durbin, West Virginia, ended in 1959.

In 1964, the C&O and the B&O jointly filed for permission to acquire control of the Western Maryland Railway with the Interstate Commerce Commission (ICC). The ICC approved the acquisition in 1968. In 1973, as part of the Chessie System, Western Maryland ownership went to C&O and it was operated by the B&O. The B&O itself merged with the C&O in 1987, which itself became part of CSX Transportation.

Legacy
Much of the original WM west of Big Pool has been abandoned including the  summit of the Allegheny Mountains and the Eastern Continental Divide near Deal, Pennsylvania. In addition to CSX, portions of the former WM are now operated by Durbin & Greenbrier Valley Railroad, the Maryland Midland Railway (MMID), Western Maryland Scenic Railroad, Pennsylvania & Southern Railway and York Railway.  A portion of the former WM roadbed in Baltimore is now used by the Baltimore Metro Subway going northwest from downtown to Owings Mills, Maryland in Baltimore County.

Other portions are now rail trails. These include the Western Maryland Rail Trail in Maryland; the Blackwater Canyon Trail and Allegheny Highlands Trail in West Virginia, and the Great Allegheny Passage in Maryland and Pennsylvania.

In Allegany County, Maryland, the Chesapeake and Ohio Canal National Historical Park includes the Western Maryland Railroad Right-of-Way, Milepost 126 to Milepost 160, listed on the National Register of Historic Places in 1981, and the Western Maryland Railway Station in Cumberland which provides tourist orientation and historical exhibits.

A former WM warehouse is still standing on Hillen Street in downtown Baltimore, next to the Orleans Street Viaduct; it is now occupied by Public Storage, which also owns and operates the building.

Subdivisions 
At the peak in the early 20th century, WM operated the following lines:

See also

:Category: Predecessors of the Western Maryland Railway
List of defunct Maryland railroads
List of defunct Pennsylvania railroads
List of defunct West Virginia railroads

References

External links

Photo tour of Western Maryland Railway
Western Maryland Story 1952. Written by Harold H. Williams, Contemporary Photography by A. Aubrey Bodine 
Western Maryland Railway Historical Society and Western Maryland Railroad Collection 1857-1961, MS. 2190 Archival materials on the railroad.
Northern West Virginia's Railroads - Descriptions of Thomas Subdivision and connecting lines
Baltimore Ghosts: Westward Ho! on the WM - Photos of Hillen Station & Other WM Facilities in Baltimore & Vicinity
The Western Maryland Railway, 'The Fast Freight Line'
List and Family Trees of North American Railroads

 
Companies affiliated with the Baltimore and Ohio Railroad
Standard gauge railways in the United States
Chesapeake and Ohio Railway
Predecessors of CSX Transportation
Defunct Maryland railroads
Defunct Pennsylvania railroads
Defunct West Virginia railroads
Former Class I railroads in the United States
Washington County, Maryland
Hagerstown, Maryland
Allegany County, Maryland
Cumberland, Maryland
Railway companies established in 1909
Railway companies disestablished in 1989
1909 establishments in Maryland
1989 disestablishments in Maryland